Workday, Inc., is an American on‑demand (cloud-based) financial management, human capital management and Student information system software vendor. Workday was founded by David Duffield, founder and former CEO of ERP company PeopleSoft, along with former PeopleSoft chief strategist Aneel Bhusri, following Oracle's acquisition of PeopleSoft in 2005.

In October 2012, Workday launched a successful IPO (initial public offering) that valued the company at $9.5 billion. Competitors of Workday include SAP Successfactors, Ceridian and Oracle.

In 2020, Fortune magazine ranked Workday Inc. at number five on their Fortune List of the Top 100 Companies to Work For in 2020 based on an employee survey of satisfaction. San Francisco Business Times ranked Workday at number two on their Best Places to Work in the Bay in the largest companies category.

History
Workday was founded in March 2005 and launched in November 2006. Initially, it was funded by Duffield and venture capital firm Greylock Partners. In December 2008, Workday moved its headquarters from Walnut Creek, California, to Pleasanton, California, where PeopleSoft founder Duffield's prior company was located.

On February 6, 2008, Workday announced that it had reached a definitive agreement to purchase Cape Clear Software. In May 2008, Workday signed a large contract with Flextronics to provide human capital management software services. Companies that have publicly disclosed contracts or deployments of Workday include Aviva, Chiquita Brands, and other firms.

On April 29, 2009, Workday announced that it secured $75 million in funding led by New Enterprise Associates. Existing investors Greylock Partners and Workday CEO and co‑founder Dave Duffield also participated in the round. On October 24, 2011, Workday announced $85 million in new funding, bringing total capital raised to $250 million. Investors in the latest round included T. Rowe Price, Morgan Stanley Investment Management, Janus, and Bezos Expeditions. As of spring 2012, Workday had 310 customers, ranging from mid-sized businesses to Fortune 500 companies.

In October 2012, Workday launched its initial public offering (IPO) on the New York Stock Exchange with ticker symbol WDAY. Its shares were priced at $28 and ended trading Friday, October 12, at $48.69, "propelled the start-up to a market capitalization of nearly $9.5 billion including unexercised stock options." It sold 22.75 million Class A shares, raising $637 million. The IPO raised more cash than any launch in the U.S. technology sector since Facebook's $16 billion IPO in May 2012. Its shares surged 74% in their IPO, underscoring investor interest in cloud computing.

In 2016 Workday launched a cloud-based Student information system to augment its portfolio of financial management and human capital management products.

In 2018 Workday acquired Filip Doušek's company Stories.bi.

The co-CEO of Workday is Aneel Bhusri, who is a partner with Greylock Partners and handled senior leadership positions earlier in his career at PeopleSoft. In 2020, Chano Fernandez was promoted to co-CEO. Dave Duffield served as the chairman of the board until his resignation in April 2022, after which Aneel Bhusri took over as the chairman.

In November 2021, Workdays announced its acquisition of VNDLY, startup that helps companies manage external workforce personnel, for $510 million.

Sequoia Capital's Carl Eschenbach replaced Fernandez as co-CEO in December 2022. The company also announced that Eschenbach would become its sole CEO after January 2024, when Bhusri will move to the role of executive chair.

Business model
Workday makes money by selling subscriptions to its services rather than selling the software outright. Expenses are booked up front when it signs on a new customer but the associated revenue is recognized over the life of multiyear agreements. In first quarter 2016, Workday announced annual revenue in excess of $1 billion for the first time ever in fiscal year 2016.

Corporate governance
Duffield holds voting rights to Workday shares that were worth $3.4 billion and Bhusri held rights to shares valued at $1.3 billion. Collectively, they hold 67% of the company's voting shares. This voting structure makes the event of a hostile takeover much less likely.

Product

Workday has released 39 updates to its product line as of September, 2022, its most recent being "2022 R2". It releases a major update every 6 months, every September and March

Workday operates data centers located in Ashburn, Virginia; Lithia Springs, Georgia; Portland, Oregon; Dublin, Ireland; Amsterdam, Netherlands; and also uses Amazon Web Services for its primary computing infrastructure platforms in order to accelerate its worldwide expansion.

In February 2014, Workday acquired the startup Identified and its artificial intelligence Syman to create its Insight Apps line of products. The first products running SYMAN were announced at Workday Rising 2014.

In July 2017, Workday CEO Aneel Bhusri announced that the company had decided to open up its platform to developers, partners and third-party software. As a result, Workday will enter the Platform as a Service (PaaS) market. Bhusri said the move will allow customers to build custom extensions and applications to work with Workday.

In January 2018, Workday announced that it acquired SkipFlag, makers of an AI knowledge base that builds itself from a company's internal communications.

Acquisitions

References

External links
 

Software companies established in 2005
American companies established in 2005
2012 initial public offerings
Software companies based in the San Francisco Bay Area
Companies based in Pleasanton, California
Cloud computing providers
Companies listed on the Nasdaq
Companies in the Nasdaq-100
Human resource management software
ERP software companies
2005 establishments in California
Software companies of the United States